Sir Richard Watkins Richards (19 July 1863 – 12 March 1920), commonly referred to as R. W. Richards, was Lord Mayor of Sydney in 1914–1915 and 1919–1920.

Early life and career
Richards was born in Wales in 1863 and came to New South Wales as a child. He was appointed City Surveyor in 1887 and retained this position until 1901. In 1919 he was appointed as a Director on the board of Sydney Hospital.

He was appointed to Dunedin City Council as Town Clerk and City Engineer in 1905 and was responsible for designing the first underground conveniences in this city, after designing the first one in Sydney 24 May 1901. His voluminous report into the options around underground facilities brought Dunedin into a new age of modernity around publicly supplied facilities. His plans can be found in the Dunedin City Council Archives. He resigned from Dunedin City Council in 1911 and returned to Sydney where he went into private practice.

Political career
He was knighted in the 1920 New Year Honours but died three months later after a long illness.

Richards was buried on 13 March 1920 at South Head Cemetery, Vaucluse, New South Wales.

Footnotes

1863 births
1920 deaths
Welsh emigrants to colonial Australia
Australian surveyors
Australian engineers
Public servants of New South Wales
Mayors and Lord Mayors of Sydney
Australian Knights Bachelor